Judith, Countess of Listowel (12 July 1903 – 15 July 2003) was a Hungarian-born journalist and writer who married William Hare, 5th Earl of Listowel in 1933.

Biography 
She was born Judit Márffy-Mantuano de Versegh et Leno on the family estate in Kaposvár, Hungary, on 12 July 1903. In 1926, she won a scholarship to study economic history at the London School of Economics, where she met "Billy" Hare, the future 5th Earl of Listowel. The couple were ill-fitted. They travelled around Europe together and separately for the rest of the decade. After World War II was declared, Lady Listowel urged both Galeazzo Ciano, Benito Mussolini's son-in-law, and her kinsman, the Hungarian prime minister Pál Teleki, not to side with Adolf Hitler.

Beginning her career as an author in the 1920s, Lady Listowel produced a volume of short stories about Hungarian society, as well as other works including: This I Have Seen (1943), which was an account of her early life, Crusader In The Secret War (1952), an account of the activities of Jan Kowalewski during World War II, Manual of Modern Manners (1959) The Modern Hostess (1961), which attracted widespread attention, The Making of Tanganyika (1965), Dusk on the Danube (1969) and the thoroughly researched A Hapsburg Tragedy—Crown Prince Rudolf (1978).

She died 3 days after her 100th birthday in July 2003, possibly in England.

References

The Borthwick Institute for Archives, University of York, holds files of Judith Hare reflecting her interest in Southern African affairs.

1903 births
2003 deaths
British non-fiction writers
British memoirists
British short story writers
Alumni of the London School of Economics
British centenarians
Hungarian centenarians
Judith
Irish countesses
Hungarian nobility
Hungarian expatriates in the United Kingdom
British people of Hungarian descent
People from Kaposvár
Women centenarians
20th-century memoirists